Felistas Murata, popularly known as Mai Tt is a Zimbabwean comedian, socialite and recording artist as well as an activist for the rights of people living with HIV/AIDS.

Background
Felistas Murata, a Zimbabwean comedian, gospel artiste, entrepreneur and MC was born in Harare, Zimbabwe where she grew up. She attended her early education at Mufakose and Glenview High school. Felistas is a proud mother of two beautiful girls. She married Tinashe Mapohsa on 9 April 2022 at a wedding ceremony where she made grand entry after arriving a helicopter (chopper) at Royalgate gardens with her beautiful daughters. The wedding was themed "the wedding of all times in the country" due to its glamour.

Murata began her career as a gospel music artist and she released songs which included Conquer and she rose to prominence through social media comedy skits in 2016. She is the ambassador for Padare Women’s Association and was appointed advocate for Young Women For ED, an affiliate organisation for president Emmerson Mnangagwa. She then won Top Female Entertainment and Social Media Enterprise and Business Leader of the Year award in 2018 from the Women’s Heritage Society World Organisation.
The following year she was recognised with Pan African Awards where she was a finalist in Southern Africa for Africa’s Most Influential Women in Business and Government, the same year, she was awarded Women of Excellence award from Ruth Pasi Foundation then in 2020, Felistas Murata was nominated for SADC Community Champion Awards in recognition for her activities with Mai Ts Diaries Foundation.

In 2020, Murata was cast for a role in a Tanzanian movie A Life of Regret but did not continue because of disputes due to lack of payment or maltreatment of artists.

Discography

Ndinouya Ikoko 2017
Dzora Mwoyo 2017
Kereke Dhukeke 2018
Makatendeka 2019
Ngithande ft Dereck Mpofu 2019
Waridongorera ft Mathias Mhere 2019
Kerekedhukeke 2020
No Other Name 2020
Anouya 2020
Gloria 2020
Letting You Go ft Kazz Khalif 2020
Ufambe Neni 2020
Life Is Not Easy Ft Denzil
Nyarara ft Lamont Chitepo 2020
Dzoka Undinyepere May 2020
Hush ft Tocky Vibes July 2020
Anouya October 2020
Sheriyo 4 December 2020
Dzora Moyo 10 December 2020
Ruregerero December 2020
Rita x Baba Harare 2021
Mwari Makanaka February 2022

References

External links
| Nash TV Interview
| 2020 Newsmakers
| Mai Titi Interview
| Sexual abuse by Awilo claims
| Women empowerment activity
| Article on HIV victims activism
| Magazine Interview

Living people
Zimbabwean comedians
1986 births
People from Harare

Zimbabwean activists